Belgischer Rundfunk (BRF) (Belgian Broadcasting) is the public-service broadcasting organisation serving the German-speaking Community of Belgium. Based in Eupen, with additional studio facilities in Sankt Vith and Brussels, BRF produces one television and three radio channels.

History

German-language broadcasts were first started in Brussels by the Nationaal Instituut voor Radio Omroep / Institut National de Radiodiffusion (NIR/INR) on 1 October 1945. In 1960, the NIR/INR became Belgische Radio en Televisie / Radio-Télévision Belge (BRT/RTB) and in 1961 RTB began a German-language radio channel, broadcasting from Liège.

In 1977, the German-language service was separated from RTB – which became Radio-Télévision Belge de la Communauté française (RTBF) – and BRT, which became Vlaamse radio en televisie (VRT) - and the new company, Belgischer Rundfunk, began broadcasting from Eupen. For some years afterward, it continued to use BRT/RTB's old stylised "ear" logo long after its French and Flemish sisters dropped it.

In October 1999 BRF-TV was created; it broadcasts by cable in the East Cantons. On 15 November 2001, BRF and Deutschlandfunk Cologne began BRF-DLF, a radio station in Brussels for German-speakers in that area.

Services

Radio
 BRF1 is the speech and entertainment network with pop and rock music (plus specialist programmes covering classical and modern chanson).
 BRF2 is the popular music network (Schlager and volkstümliche Musik).

The group participates in two more projects:
 BRF-DLF combines the speech output of BRF1 with that of Deutschlandfunk.
 100.5 Das Hitradio music station for German speaking part of Belgium, launched in 1998.

Television
 BRF TV broadcasts locally produced news and documentary programmes and can only be received fully via cable, Proximus TV and VOO digital TV. Their news program is also broadcast twice a day on the Euronews channel of the free-to-air DVB-T service of the RTBF.

References

External links

 Listen to BRF1 live
 Listen to BRF2 live

1977 establishments in Belgium
Television networks in Belgium
Eupen
German-language television networks
Mass media in Brussels
Publicly funded broadcasters
Radio networks
Radio stations in Belgium
Radio stations established in 1977
Television channels and stations established in 1999